These are the results of the boxing competition at the 1936 Summer Olympics in Berlin.  Medals were awarded in eight weight classes. The competitions were held from 10 to 15 August.

The competition featured prominently in the French film L'as des as (1982), whose main character, played by Jean-Paul Belmondo, was the fictitious coach of the French boxing team.

Participating nations
A total of 179 boxers from 31 nations competed at the Berlin Games:

Medal summary

Medal table

References

External links
 International Olympic Committee medal database

 
1936 Summer Olympics events
1936
1936 in boxing
Boxing in Germany